Widmer is a surname. Notable people with the surname include:

 Albert Widmer, inventor of 8b/10b encoding
 Arthur Widmer (1914–2006), American film special effects pioneer
 Carolyn Ladd Widmer (1902–1991), academic dean at the University of Connecticut
 Daniel Widmer, Swiss curler
 Edward L. Widmer (born 1963), historian, speechwriter, and librarian
 Eric Widmer (born 1940), American scholar and educator
 Gabrielle Oberhänsli-Widmer (born 1957), Professor of Jewish studies at the University of Freiburg
 Gianni Widmer (1892–1971), flight pioneer
 Marise Widmer, American rower
 Markus Widmer, Swiss curler
 Pierre Widmer (1912–1999), French Mennonite pastor
 Samuel Widmer (1948–2017)
 Sigmund Widmer (1919–2003), Swiss politician
 Silvan Widmer (born 1993), Swiss footballer

See also
 Widmer Brothers Brewery, an American brewery founded in 1984 in Portland, Oregon by brothers Kurt and Rob Widmer

Swiss-language surnames